Something for the Boys is a 1944 musical comedy film directed by Lewis Seiler. It stars Carmen Miranda, with Michael O'Shea, Vivian Blaine, Phil Silvers, Sheila Ryan and Perry Como.

The screenplay was by Robert Ellis, Helen Logan and Frank Gabrielson, based on the 1943 Broadway Musical of the same name, starring Ethel Merman with Cole Porter's songs. The film's story revolves around the adventures of three cousins who find themselves joint heirs to an abandoned mansion in Masonville, Georgia. Chiquita Hart, played by Miranda, Harry (Phil Silvers) and Blossom (Vivian Blaine) leave their jobs, and decide to reform the place and rent it for military spouses who are in the war front, combining the hostel service to performers shows.

Judy Holliday can be spotted in a brief role six minutes into the film. This is her third film.

Plot
After cousins actress Blossom Hart (Vivian Blaine), defense plant worker Chiquita Hart (Carmen Miranda) and inventor Harry Hart (Phil Silvers) each learn that they are heirs to a large plantation in Masonville, Georgia, they travel separately to Masonville, and in the office of lawyer Col. Jefferson L. Calhoun, meet for the first time. As they are all poor, they are thrilled by the inheritance, but when Calhoun takes them to Magnolia Manor, they discover that the once glorious plantation house is now a ruin. In addition, paying the plantation's various property and inheritance taxes will put them deeply in debt. While the cousins are bemoaning their fate, Staff Sgt. Ronald "Rocky" Fulton (Michael O'Shea), who was a well-known orchestra leader before joining the military, arrives with some of his men, including Sgt. Laddie Green (Perry Como).

Rockie explains that the married service men of nearby Camp Dixon want to rent rooms in the manor for their wives, who have been unable to live close to their husbands due to a lack of available housing. The men pitch in and help the cousins fix up the manor, although Chiquita is continually bothered by the fact that she can pick up radio programs on the fillings in her teeth. Rocky, who has begun a romance with Blossom, suggests that they put on a musical show to raise funds for the renovations. On the day that "The Old Southern Corn Revue" is to open, Blossom is stunned by the arrival of Melanie Walker (Sheila Ryan), a snobbish, rich woman, who Rocky is forced to admit is his fiancé. Melanie, believing that Rocky has arranged for the manor to be let just for her, imperiously announces the changes she intends to make, and the infuriated Blossom refuses to speak to Rocky. Before the show, Rocky explains to a disapproving Chiquita that he loves only Blossom. The show is a big success, and the next morning, Chiquita advises Blossom to fight for Rocky if she loves him. The snooty Melanie ends up covered with eggs after she tries to work one of Harry's new inventions, and she seeks solace from Lt. Ashley Crothers (Glenn Langan). While the lieutenant is there, he discovers that Harry is hosting a dice game for some of the soldiers, none of whom have wives staying at the manor.

Crothers arrests the soldiers and recommends that the house be posted as off-limits for all military personnel. Col. Grubbs approves Crother's suggestion, and soon the wives are packing to leave. Meanwhile, after Harry learns that carborundum from the defense plant got into Chiquita's fillings and is causing her to receive radio programs, he decides to build an invention around the idea. One afternoon, Rocky comes to the house to try to talk to Blossom, who refuses to see him. Rocky is supposed to be on duty for war games, and is captured by the "enemy" army, which has taken over the manor as its headquarters. Hoping to save both his stripes and the manor, Rocky enlists the aid of Chiquita and Harry, who begin building a transmitter to send a message to Rocky's unit via Chiquita's teeth. The message is sent, and the cousins distract the "enemy" army with a song and dance show while Rocky's army assembles for its attack. Soon after, Rocky's side has prevailed in the maneuvers, and in appreciation of Blossom, Chiquita and Harry's help, the off-limits sign is removed and the manor is once again the site of much happiness for the military men and their wives. At a celebratory party, Rocky announces that he has been selected for officer's candidate school, and the happy Blossom reconciles with him.

Cast 
 Carmen Miranda as Chiquita Hart  
 Michael O'Shea as Sergeant Ronald 'Rocky' Fulton  
 Vivian Blaine as Blossom Hart  
 Phil Silvers as Harry Hart  
 Sheila Ryan as Melanie Walker  
 Perry Como as Sergeant Laddie Green  
 Glenn Langan as Lieutenant Ashley Crothers
 Thurston Hall as Colonel Jefferson L. Calhoun 
 June Haver as Chorine

Production
The film is based on the 1943 Broadway Musical of the same name, which featured songs by Cole Porter and was a starring vehicle for Ethel Merman, who played Blossom. However, the film version uses only the title song from Porter's score, and otherwise features no music from the stage show. In addition, Chiquta's role was expanded for Miranda: in the musical, it is Blossom who receives messages from her fillings.

According to information in the Twentieth Century-Fox Records of the Legal Department, located at the UCLA Library, in November 1942, the studio advanced $62,500 to Michael Todd and Savoy Productions for production of the musical, then purchased the screen rights to it in 1943. Although the legal records give the purchase price as $265,000, a 12 March 1943 The Hollywood Reporter news item lists the amount paid by Fox as $305,000. Per the agreement with Todd, Fox could not release the film until at least the summer of 1944, which, as The Hollywood Reporter noted, was to "enable the stage original to play the key cities and tour without competition from the celluloid version." Only one of Cole Porter's songs for the musical was included in the film version. The Hollywood Reporter news items note that William Perlberg was originally slated to produce this film, Irving Cummings was to direct it and Betty Grable was to star in it.

In January 1944, H. Bruce Humberstone was assigned to direct the picture and Brenda Marshall was set for the female lead. According to The Hollywood Reporter, Humberstone auditioned The Jeepers, a seven-piece novelty orchestra, but they do not appear in the finished film. Although a 23 February 1944 The Hollywood Reporter news item noted that dance director Nick Castle was working with Carmen Miranda to prepare a "four-movement, symphonic treatment" of the popular song Mairzy Doats, the number was not included in the film.

In April 1944, The Hollywood Reporter noted that Scott Elliott had been tested for the film, but his participation in the finished picture has not been confirmed. Although a The Hollywood Reporter news item and studio press releases include Billie Seward, Stanley Prager, Chester Conklin, Harry Seymour and Jo-Carroll Dennison in the cast, they do not appear in the completed film. The picture marked the screen debuts of popular singer Perry Como and actor Rory Calhoun, who appeared under the name Frank McCown. Modern sources also include Judy Holliday in the cast. A studio credit sheet lists the film's running time as 78 min.

According to information in the legal records and the Twentieth Century-Fox Produced Scripts Collection, the following writers worked on various versions of the screenplay: Harry Segall, Marian Spitzer, Eddie Welch, Snag Werris, Samuel Hoffenstein and Betty Reinhardt. The extent of their contributions to the completed film has not been confirmed, however. Notes from a 12 January 1944 studio conference reveal that production head Darryl F. Zanuck wanted the same writers who wrote Greenwich Village, a 1944 Twentieth Century-Fox picture starring Carmen Miranda, to write Miranda's dialogue for this film, because "they wrote especially for her, with mispronunciations, etc., and she is very funny when she is given this style of writing." The Greenwich Village screenwriters did not contribute to Something for the Boys, but Miranda's trademark mangling of the English language is included in the film.

The studio records also note that the Southland Routine, which is performed by Phil Silvers, includes excerpts from the following songs: Southland by Silvers, Harold Adamson and Jimmy McHugh; Dixie's Land by Dan Emmet; All Over God's Heaven, traditional spiritual; Shortnin' Bread, words by Jacques Wolfe, music traditional; Indian Dance by Urban Theilman; and Climin' Up Dem Golden Stairs by McHugh and Adamson. The studio records contain letters from songwriters Jule Styne and Sammy Cahn, who stated that the Southland Routine was based on their work.

In early 1945, Twentieth Century-Fox paid the composers three thousand dollars not to pursue their claim. According to a 3 February 1943 The Hollywood Reporter news item, owners of the radio show The Court of Missing Heirs filed an infringement of copyright lawsuit against the producers and owners of the play Something for the Boys. The owners of the radio program alleged that the play infringed on their show's premise. The disposition of the suit is unknown.

Release
The film was released on November 1, 1944. In June 2008, Something for the Boys was released in DVD as part of Fox's "The Carmen Miranda Collection."

Critical reception 
On the film's release on November 1, 1944, Bosley Crowther of The New York Times said that Something for the Boys features a "variety of musics, much gay humor and a superabundance of beautiful girls. As for tempestuous Miss Miranda, she is still rather fearful to behold, and sings as a human radio set." Time magazine wrote that the film "turns out to have nothing very remarkable. There is not Carmen Miranda." 
 
"It should be more fun than it is," wrote Dave Kehr in the Chicago Reader. Variety thought that it was "sufficiently diverting and tuneful to warrant more than moderate success at the box-office." Perry Como, the magazine said, "makes a good appearance before the cameras" and his two songs were "quite listenable and well sold."

References

External links

 
 
 
 

1944 films
1944 musical comedy films
20th Century Fox films
American musical comedy films
American films based on plays
Films directed by Lewis Seiler
Films scored by Leigh Harline
Films based on musicals
1940s American films